Richard  Lee (1726–1795), known most commonly as "Squire", was a prominent Virginia planter, and American politician, who was active in the American Revolutionary War. He represented Westmoreland County Virginia continuously (but on a part-time basis) in the Virginia General Assembly from 1757 (when the lower house was known as the House of Burgesses, through the five Virginia Revolutionary Conventions until his death in 1795 (when it was known as the Virginia House of Delegates). Complicating matters, he had a cousin also known as Squire Richard Lee, who built Blenheim in Maryland.

Early and family life

He was born at "Lee Hall" in Westmoreland County, Virginia, the third of seven children born to Henry Lee I (1691–1747) and Mary Bland (1704–1764). His eldest brother John Lee (1724-1767) inherited land by primogeniture as well as served as clerk of nearby Essex County and briefly served in the House of Burgesses for that county before returning to Westmoreland county where he lived until his death. His brother Henry moved to Leesylvania in Prince William County, and his sister Letitia married Col. William Ball of Lancaster County. Through his father's brother, Thomas 1690-1750, he was the first cousin to Founding Fathers Richard Henry Lee and Francis Lightfoot Lee—both signers of the Declaration of Independence.

Career

Squire Lee served in the Virginia House of Burgesses, as a representative from Westmoreland, after his cousin Philip Ludwell Lee was elevated to the Council of State (the legislature's upper hours), and the burgess position became vacant in 1757. Beginning in 1758, Westmoreland voters elected this man alongside his cousin Richard Henry Lee until Governor Dunmore dissolved the House of Burgesses in 1775. Westmoreland voters then contiunously elected both men to all the Virginia Revolutionary Conventions, adding John Augustine Washington when three representatives were permitted beginning in the Third Revolutionary Convention, though J.A. Washington was disqualified in the 4th convention. Thus he served in the Virginia Constitutional Convention, which drafted the 1776 version of the Constitution of Virginia. Upon creation of the Virginia House of Delegates in 1776, after Virginia signed the Declaration of Independence and the American Revolutionary War began, Richard Lee continued winning re-election and representing Westmoreland County in the legislature until his death, although he had a number of different co-delegates.

Lee also served as Justice of the Peace for Westmoreland County, Virginia and was a Naval Officer for the Port of Potomac.

Personal life
In 1786, at the age of 60, he married his cousin, 17-year-old Sarah Bland "Sally" Poythress (1768 – 24 May 1828), a daughter of Peter Poythress (1715–1785) of "Branchester" and Elizabeth Bland (1733–1792). The couple had 5 children;

Richard Lee II (1788–1790)
Mary Lee (12 February 1790 – 1848) who married Thomas Jones of Chesterfield County, Virginia
Lettice Lee (1792–1827) who married Dr. John Augustine Smith
a son who died in infancy (c. 1793)
Richardia (b. 1795) who married Presley Cox in 1815

Death and legacy
He died at Lee hall in 1795 and was buried there. After his death,his widow Sally married secondly Willoughby Newton and was the mother of Willoughby Newton.

References

1726 births
1795 deaths
House of Burgesses members
Lee family of Virginia
Members of the Virginia House of Delegates
People from Westmoreland County, Virginia
Virginia colonial people
18th-century American politicians